The Spain national beach soccer team represents Spain in international beach soccer competitions and is controlled by the RFEF, the governing body for football in Spain.

Results and fixtures

The following is a list of match results in the last 12 months, as well as any future matches that have been scheduled.

Legend

2021

Players

Current squad
The following players and staff members were called up for the 2021 FIFA Beach Soccer World Cup.

Head coach: Cristian Mendez Lacarcel 
Assistant coach: Jesus Sanchez Requena

Competitive record

Beach Soccer World Championships

FIFA Beach Soccer World Cup

Honours
FIFA Beach Soccer World Cup:
Runner-up: 2003, 2004, 2013
Third place: 2000
Euro Beach Soccer League: 1999, 2000, 2001, 2003, 2006
Runner-up: 2002, 2014, 2018
Euro Beach Soccer Cup: 1999, 2008, 2009, 2014
Runner-up: 1998, 2001, 2002, 2004
Third place: 2003
Mundialito de Futebol de Praia: 2013
Runner-up: 1997, 2004, 2012, 2018
Third place: 2001, 2003, 2009, 2019
Copa Latina:
Runner-up: 2000, 2004
Third place: 1998
FIFA Beach Soccer World Cup qualification: 2008, 2009, 2013

See also
 Spain women's national beach soccer team

References

External links
Spain at BSWW
 Spain at Beach Soccer Russia 

European national beach soccer teams
Beach soccer